D.R. Horton, Inc. is a home construction company incorporated in Delaware and headquartered in Arlington, Texas. Since 2002, the company has been the largest homebuilder by volume in the United States. The company ranked number 194 on the 2019 Fortune 500 list of the largest United States corporations by revenue. The company operates in 90 markets in 29 states.

D.R. Horton operates four brands: D.R. Horton, Emerald Homes, Express Homes, and Freedom Homes. Express Homes is tailored to entry-level buyers while the Emerald Homes brand is sold as luxury real estate. Freedom Homes caters to the active adult community.

History
The company was founded in 1978 by Donald R. Horton. Horton took the company public in 1992, and owns about 6% of the company. In 1997, the company acquired Continental Homes for $305 million and the assumption of $278 million in debt. The company also entered the Tucson, Arizona market. In 1998, the company promoted Donald J. Tomnitz to vice chairman and chief executive and promoted Richard Beckwitt to president. The company also acquired Cambridge Homes.

The company completed more acquisitions throughout the years. In 1999, the company acquired Century Title Agency. In 2001, the company acquired Emerald Builders and Fortress Homes and Communities of Florida. In 2002, the company acquired Schuler Homes. The company also acquired 300 acres in Arlington, Texas.

In 2013, the company re-entered the Nashville market.

In April 2015, the company acquired Pacific Ridge Homes, based in Seattle, for $72 million. The acquisition included 350 lots, 90 homes in inventory and 40 homes in sales order backlog. Horton also acquired control of about 400 lots through option contracts.

In May 2015, the company received approval from the Honolulu City Council to begin construction on an 11,750-home planned community in West Oahu, Hawaii.

In 2016, the company acquired Wilson Parker Homes for $90 million.

In 2017, the company moved its headquarters from Fort Worth, Texas to Arlington, Texas.

In 2018, the company acquired Terramor Homes, Classic Builders, and Westport Homes.

Controversies
The Supreme Court of the United States heard the appeal of a case in which the National Labor Relations Board held that the company violated the National Labor Relations Act by requiring its employees to sign an arbitration agreement that prohibited them from pursuing claims in a collective or class action.

References

External links

1978 establishments in Texas
Companies listed on the New York Stock Exchange
Companies based in Arlington, Texas
Construction and civil engineering companies established in 1978
Construction and civil engineering companies of the United States
Home builders
1992 initial public offerings